Urgun is a district of the remote Paktika Province in Afghanistan.

Administrative seat

The administrative seat of this district is the like-named town of Urgun, also known as Loy Urgun, meaning "Greater Urgun".

History

Urgun town used to be the provincial capital until it was replaced by Sharana in the 1970s due to its proximity to the main highway, connecting it to Kabul, Ghazni, and Kandahar.

The Siege of Urgun took place between 1983 and 1984.

Demographics

The largest tribe in Urgun are the Tajik,formuli, Paktika Province Tribal Map (Page 11). Naval Postgraduate School.</ref> Other tribes include the Kharoti, Sulaimankhel, and Wazir. There are also Uzbeks and Sayed People in smaller numbers.

Like many place names in Afghanistan, Urgun can be spelled a number of different ways. "Urgon", "Orgun" and "Orgon", however, remain the most popular alternative spellings on maps and official documents.

Urgun is 7,492 ft above sea level.

References

Districts of Paktika Province